Sky Uno is an Italian entertainment television channel, based on the defunct reality television channel SKY Vivo, both owned and operated by Sky Italia.

It broadcasts Italian dubs of the shows The X Factor, Got Talent, The Apprentice, MasterChef, MasterChef Junior, Hell's Kitchen and Top Gear.

The channel began broadcasting in high-definition on 20 October 2011.

Programming

Current

Former programming

Logos

References

External links
Sky Uno on sky.it 

Sky Italia
Italian-language television stations
Television channels in Italy
Television channels and stations established in 2009